Astráin is a locality and council located in the municipality of Cizur, in Navarre province, Spain, Spain. As of 2020, it has a population of 330.

Geography 
Astráin is located 17km southwest of Pamplona.

References

Populated places in Navarre